Sir John Colleton, 1st Baronet was an English Royalist.

John Colleton may also refer to:

John Colleton (priest) (1548–1635), English Roman Catholic divine
Several of the Colleton baronets

See also
Colleton (surname)